Excuse or Excuses may refer to:

Excuse
Rationalization (psychology)

Music
 "Excuse", a song from the album Minecraft – Volume Alpha by C418
 "Excuses", a song by The Hard-Ons	1985
 "Excuses", a song by Alanis Morissette from her album So-Called Chaos
 "Excuses", a song by AP Dhillon, Gurinder Gill, and Intense
 "Excuses", a song by twlv
 "Excuses (Mentis song)", 2021

 "Excuse Me Mr.", a song by American rock band No Doubt

See also
Excuse My French (disambiguation), various meanings